Scotia was a village in Patton Township, Centre County, Pennsylvania, at . Although the community was called Scotia, the name of the local post office was Benore (Ben being the Gaelic for "mountain [of]").

It got its start when Andrew Carnegie, through the Edgar Thomson Steel Company, leased large tracts of iron ore in the township. Small-scale mining had taken place here since the late 18th century, but Carnegie organized a major effort to exploit the deposits in 1880. Ore was removed from a broad open pit, washed to separate it from clay, and loaded onto railcars. The Pennsylvania Railroad had extended its Fairbrook Branch to the village in 1881, and hauled the ore to steel mills in Pittsburgh. There was also an extensive narrow-gauge railroad in the pits to haul ore to the washer, and several artesian wells and a reservoir to supply water for ore washing.

Carnegie sold the ore deposits to the Bellefonte Furnace Company in 1899, feeling that they were no longer economical to work and ship to Pittsburgh. Immediately after the sale, the Bellefonte Central Railroad built a new branch from Graysdale to Scotia, allowing the ore to be shipped directly to the company's furnaces rather than take a roundabout route on the PRR. However, mining halted in about 1913, and all the assets of the Bellefonte Furnace Company were sold at foreclosure in 1914. The Bellefonte Central abandoned its line to Scotia in 1915, and the PRR in 1927. The village had already been vacated in 1922 or 1923.

There was a brief attempt to revive mining at Scotia during World War II, and the Bellefonte Central received Reconstruction Finance Corporation money to build a new branch from Alto to Scotia to serve the new facilities. However, the mine was only briefly in operation before the cessation of hostilities, and soon ceased permanently. The area is now encompassed by Pennsylvania State Game Lands No. 176.

References

Ghost towns in Pennsylvania
Geography of Centre County, Pennsylvania